The Movement for the self-determination of Kabylie (MAK; Kabyle: Amussu i ufraniman n tmurt n iqbayliyen; , named Movement for the autonomy of Kabylie (Kabyle: Afraniman i Tmurt n Yeqbayliyen;  before 3 October 2013); is a Kabyle nationalist and separatist political organization seeking autonomy, self-determination rights of the Kabyle people, and ultimately independence of the Kabylie province from Algeria. It was founded by the Kabyle Berberist Ferhat Mehenni, now president of the Provisional Government of Kabylie in exile, after the "Black Spring" disturbances in 2001.

Since 2021, the MAK has been classified as a terrorist organisation in Algeria after claims from the Algerian authorities saying that MAK members were planning car bombs. The founder of MAK, Mehenni, is arrested by the French authorities and placed in police custody in 2021 as part of an investigation into organised money laundering in relation to sports betting.

In 2011, a close associate of Ferhat Mehenni and a former senior member of the organisation, Idir Djouder, accused the MAK of receiving funds from Morocco (250,000 euros per month) and criticised its management methods. Idir Djouder uses the term "dictator", he describes his "government" and the content of the meetings as formal with decisions taken "elsewhere".

On August 26, 2021, Algeria issued an international arrest warrant for Ferhat Mehenni

On Thursday, May 19, 2022 in Paris, The Kabyle provisional government (Anavad) and the Movement for the self-determination of Kabylia (MAK) presented, the very first draft of the Constitution of what will be the Federal Republic of Kabylia.

MAK claims to speak for the  Kabyle people, who express frustration due to the efforts of the Algerian government to assimilate the remaining Berber ethnic group minorities into the Arabized Berber and Arab majority. The immediate goal of MAK is regional self-determination for the province of Kabylie, which, according to Mehenni, could be the "first step towards a Kabyle, Berber State".

See also
 Kabyle people
 Berber people
 Politics of Algeria
 Barbacha - A self-governing town in Kabylie.
 Rally for Culture and Democracy (RCD) - The main Liberal Berber party.
 Socialist Forces Front (FFS) - The main Socialist Berber party.
 Arouch Movement - A Kabyle political organization modelled on traditional village councils.

References

External links
"The Other Intifada" Boston Globe report on the MAK
"Autonomy in Kabylia: breaking a taboo" Discussion of the autonomist movement in Kabylia in general by Professor Salem Chaker.
 MAK official website

Algerian democracy movements
Berber separatism in North Africa
Berberism in Algeria
Berberist political parties
Federalist parties
Governments in exile
Kabylie
Liberal parties in Algeria
Libertarian parties
Nationalist parties in Algeria
Organizations designated as terrorist by Algeria
Secularism in Algeria
Secularist organizations